Bertrada of Laon (born between 710 and 727 – 12 July 783), also known as Bertrada the Younger or Bertha Broadfoot (cf. Latin: Regina pede aucae i.e. the queen with the goose-foot), was a Frankish queen. She was the wife of Pepin the Short and the mother of Charlemagne, Carloman and Gisela, plus five other children.

Nickname
Bertrada's nickname "Bertha Broadfoot" dates back to the 13th century, when it was used in Adenes Le Roi's trouvère Li rouman de Berte aus grands piés. The exact reason that Bertrada was given this nickname is unclear. It is possible that Bertrada was born with a clubfoot, although Adenes does not mention this in his poem. The nickname might have been a reference to an ancient legend about a Germanic goddess named Perchta, to real and mythological queens named Bertha, or to several similarly named Christian queens. Many myths and legends exist in Europe and Asia, in which clubfooted people are described as the link between the world of the living and the spirit world. The tavern sign in Anatole France's novel At the Sign of the Reine Pédauque alludes to this queen.

Biography

Early life and ancestry
Bertrada was born sometime between 710 and 727 in Laon, in today's Aisne, France, to Count Charibert of Laon. Charibert's father might have been related to Hugobertides. Charibert's mother was Bertrada of Prüm, who founded Prüm Abbey along with Charibert.

Marriage and children
Bertrada married Pepin the Short, the son of Charles Martel, the Frankish "Mayor of the Palace", in 741. However, Pepin and Bertrada were too closely related for their marriage to be legal at that time; the union was not canonically sanctioned until 749, after the birth of Charlemagne.

According to French historian Léon Levillain, Bertrada was Pepin's first and only wife. Other sources suggest that Pepin had previously married a "Leutberga" or "Leutbergie", with whom Pepin would have had five children.

Bertrada and Pepin are known to have had eight children: at least three sons and at least four daughters. Of these, Charlemagne (c. 742 – 814), Carloman (751–771) and Gisela (757–811) survived to adulthood. Pepin, born in 756, died young in 762. Bertrada and Pepin also had Berthe, Adelaide, and Rothaide. Gisela became a nun at Chelles Abbey.

Queen of the Franks

In 751, Pepin and Bertrada became King and Queen of the Franks, following Pepin's successful coup against the Frankish Merovingian monarchs. Pepin was crowned in June 754, and Bertrada, Charlemagne, and Carloman were blessed by Pope Stephen II.

After Pepin's death in 768, Bertrada lost her title as Queen of the Franks. Charlemagne and Carloman inherited the two halves of Pepin's kingdom. Bertrada stayed at the court and often tried to stop arguments between the two brothers. Some historians credit Bertrada's support for her elder son Charlemagne over her younger son Carloman, and her diplomatic skills, for Charlemagne's early success. Although her influence over Charlemagne may have diminished in time, she lived at his court, and, according to Einhard, their relationship was excellent. Bertrada recommended that Charlemagne set aside his legal wife, Himiltrude, and marry Desiderata, a daughter of the Lombard king Desiderius, but Charlemagne soon divorced Desiderata. Einhard claims this was the only episode that ever strained relations between mother and son.

Later life and death
Bertrada retired from the court after Carloman's death in 771 to live in Choisy-au-Bac, where Charlemagne had set aside a royal house for her. Choisy-au-Bac was favorable because of its history of being the home and burial place of several Merovingian kings.

Bertrada died on 12 July 783  in Choisy-au-Bac. Charlemagne buried her in the Basilica of St Denis near Pepin.

In literature
Bertrada inspired Adenes Le Roi to write the poem Li rouman de Berte aus grands piés in 1270. Adenes referred to her as "Bertha Broadfoot", the earliest known usage of that nickname.

Bertrada is also referred to as "Bertha Broadfoot" in François Villon's 15th-century poem Ballade des dames du temps jadis.

Notes

References

8th-century births
783 deaths
Year of birth uncertain
8th-century Frankish women
People from Picardy
Queen mothers
Frankish queens consort
Carolingian dynasty
Burgundian queens consort
Burials at the Basilica of Saint-Denis